Eva Christina Hedström (31 May 1942, in Solna – 20 October 1984, in Stockholm) was a Swedish actress, best known internationally for appearing as Tamara Kusenov in the Alfred Hitchcock film Topaz (1969). She also appeared in several Swedish films.

Filmography

References

External links

 

1942 births
1984 deaths
People from Solna Municipality
Swedish film actresses
Swedish television actresses